Maldonado Base, also Pedro Vicente Maldonado Base, is the Ecuadorian Antarctic research base situated at Guayaquil Bay, Greenwich Island.
It is located in the South Shetland Islands, Antarctica. It opened in 1990. The area was visited by early 19th century sealers operating from nearby Clothier Harbour.

The base is named after the Spanish-American astronomer, topographer, and geographer Pedro Vicente Maldonado (1704–1748) born in Riobamba, present Ecuador.

There is a lighthouse near the base.

Location

Maps
 L.L. Ivanov et al. Antarctica: Livingston Island and Greenwich Island, South Shetland Islands. Scale 1:100000 topographic map. Sofia: Antarctic Place-names Commission of Bulgaria, 2005.
 L.L. Ivanov. Antarctica: Livingston Island and Greenwich, Robert, Snow and Smith Islands. Scale 1:120000 topographic map. Troyan: Manfred Wörner Foundation, 2010.  (First edition 2009. )

See also
 List of lighthouses in Antarctica
 List of Antarctic research stations
 List of Antarctic field camps

References

 SCAR Composite Antarctic Gazetteer.
 Essy Santana and Jean Dumont. Granulometry of pebble beach ridges in Fort Williams Point, Greenwich Island, Antarctic Peninsula; a possible result from Holocene climate fluctuations. U.S. Geological Survey and The National Academies; USGS OF-2007-1047, Short Research Paper 027, 2007.

External links
 Instituto Antartico Ecuatoriano 

Geography of Greenwich Island
Outposts of the South Shetland Islands
Lighthouses in Antarctica
1990 establishments in Antarctica